Saadeh (in ) or Saadé is a common Lebanese family name based on the Arabic for happiness. Alternative ways of writing the name are Saade, Saadé and Saada.

Persons
Antun Saadeh, Lebanese-Syrian nationalist philosopher, writer and politician who founded the Syrian Social Nationalist Party
Eric Saade, Swedish singer of Palestinian-Lebanese origin
Georges Saadeh, Lebanese politician, former minister and former head of the Kataeb (Phalangist) party
Jacques Saadé, Lebanese-born businessman, living in Marseille, France
Jorge Saade, Ecuadorian violinist of Lebanese descent
Nemer Saadé, Lebanese men's fashion designer
Wadih Saadeh, Lebanese poet, writer, and journalist
Saadé family, Lebanese-Syrian family who own wineries in the Middle East

Others
Saade Vol. 1, a 2011 album by Swedish singer Eric Saade
Saade Vol. 2, a 2011 album by Swedish singer Eric Saade and follow up to Saade Vol. 1
Saadeh v. Farouki, a judicial case decided in the D.C. Circuit that espoused a narrow reading of existing laws in order to limit US federal diversity jurisdiction.